was a Japanese garden designer, garden architect, landscape gardener, landscape architect, and garden creator, who was known for his Japanese-style gardens. Araki was born in Osaka and graduated from the Tokyo Landscaping School (which later became the School of Landscape Architecture at the Tokyo University of Agriculture). Araki trained in landscape design and construction under Sentaro Iwaki in Tokyo.

Selected works 
Major works in Japan
 Tokyo Marine and Fire Insurance Company Building, Limited outside this space
 Katsuō-ji improved garden
 Sekikawa House Garden
 Kanketsusen in Higashi Yūenchi of Kobe
 The extracellular space, Shinjuku NS Building
 Otani Art Museum, The garden of renewal
 Kyuanji, twelfth temple of flower in Kansai
 Ikebukuro Subcenter redevelopment (Central Park of Higashi-Ikebukuro, Sunshine 60 Building green space)
 Japanese garden of the American consulate in Kobe
and many others

Major works in the world
 Embassy of Japan in Bangkok, Thailand
 Japanese garden of the residence of the Japanese ambassador in South Korea
 Japanese garden of the residence of the Japanese ambassador in Washington DC, United States
 Waterfall Garden Park in Seattle, Washington, United States
 Japanischer Garten in Augsburg, Germany
 Japanese garden of Planten un Blomen in Hamburg, Germany
 Japanese Garden of National Botanical Garden of Cuba in Havana, Cuba
 Araki designed gardens at the Royal Hotel Osaka in a series of landscape design landscaping planning, work planning, which was the winner of a designing award winning Japanese Institute of Landscape Architecture department.
 Parks and Open Space Association of Japan Kitamura Award 15th in 1993

References

Bibliography 
 Tribute to Dr. Yoshikuni Araki, Keiji Uehara Prize winner 1997 (15 th Prize winner Keiji Uehara-person interview),Kimio Kondo,Washio KimuWataru,Journal of the Japanese Institute of Landscape Architecture Institute of Landscape 61 (4), 357-358, 1998-03-27, url - http://ci.nii.ac.jp/naid/110004305861

Japanese landscape architects
1921 births
1997 deaths